John T. Dickert (born December 6, 1962) is an American Democratic politician and was the 57th mayor of Racine, Wisconsin.  He now works as the Administrator of the Division of State and Local Finance in the Wisconsin Department of Revenue, appointed by Governor Tony Evers in May 2019.

He was elected mayor in a 2009 special election and was re-elected twice, in 2011 and 2015. He resigned as mayor in 2017 to work as executive director of the Great Lakes and St. Lawrence Cities Initiative.

Early life
Dickert's familial roots extend three generations in Racine. In 1880, his great-great grandfather arrived and started a family and small plumbing business, Dickert Brothers Plumbing Company. That business lasted more than a century. John Dickert was born December 6, 1962. He attended St. Catherine's High School and received his bachelor's degree in political science and mass communication from the University of Wisconsin–La Crosse. While in college, he was elected to the La Crosse County Board of Supervisors. Dickert then worked as an intern for Congressman Les Aspin in Washington D.C. Dickert returned to Racine to serve as Congressional District Director for State Assemblyman Peter Barca. Dickert ran twice in Democratic primary elections for Wisconsin State Assembly in the 61st district against Robert Turner, but was defeated both times.  Dickert became a real estate agent for Coldwell Banker in 2003 and First Weber in 2007, then ran for mayor of Racine in 2009.

Mayoralty

John Dickert served as mayor from May 2009 through July 2017. He was first elected to finish the term of Gary E. Becker, who had resigned in January after being charged with six felonies. He was elected on May 5, 2009, and was inaugurated on May 19, taking over from acting Mayor Tom Friedel. After winning regular elections in August 2011 and again in August 2015, Dickert ultimately served one full term and two partial terms.

While mayor, Dickert served as president of the Urban Alliance, a group of mayors from Wisconsin’s largest metro regions, from its creation in 2011 until he was succeeded by Manitowoc mayor Justin Nickels in 2014. Dickert also served on the United States Conference of Mayors, primarily as Vice Chair of the Metro Economies Committee, as well as on its Mayors Water Council. Additionally, he was a member of Governor Scott Walker’s Wisconsin Coastal Management Council.

On March 27, 2017, Dickert announced his plans to resign from the mayoralty to take the position of executive director at the Great Lakes and St. Lawrence Cities Initiative, a binational group of U.S. and Canadian "mayors and local officials working to advance the protection and restoration of the Great Lakes and St. Lawrence River." Dickert had previously served on the organization's board of directors, and was the chairman of the board between 2014 and 2015.

Dickert formally resigned on July 16, 2017, and Dennis Wiser, previously president of the Racine City Council, automatically became acting mayor. Democrat Cory Mason was elected Mayor of Racine, Wisconsin on November 7, 2017 after winning the special election.

Department of Revenue
In May 2019, Dickert was tapped by newly-inaugurated Governor Tony Evers and newly-appointed Secretary of Revenue Peter W. Barca to serve as administrator for the Division of State and Local Finance in the Wisconsin Department of Revenue.  The Division of State and Local Finance is responsible for administering the state's property tax valuation and assessment program, with emphasis on properly valuing commercial, manufacturing, and other special properties.  On his appointment, Secretary Barca said: "John's background as the former three-term mayor of the City of Racine along with his experience in residential and commercial real estate provides him with a unique perspective for this position.  His keen understanding of local government and the issues facing local government officials will help us to better serve their needs and, more importantly, their citizens."

Personal life
Dickert lives in Racine with his wife and two children Riley and Eleanor.

Electoral history

Wisconsin Assembly (1990, 2002)

| colspan="6" style="text-align:center;background-color: #e9e9e9;"| Primary Election

| colspan="6" style="text-align:center;background-color: #e9e9e9;"| General Election

| colspan="6" style="text-align:center;background-color: #e9e9e9;"| Primary Election

| colspan="6" style="text-align:center;background-color: #e9e9e9;"| General Election

Racine Mayor (2009–2015)

| colspan="6" style="text-align:center;background-color: #e9e9e9;"| Primary Election, April 7, 2009

| colspan="6" style="text-align:center;background-color: #e9e9e9;"| Special Election, May 5, 2009

| colspan="6" style="text-align:center;background-color: #e9e9e9;"| General Election, April 5, 2011

| colspan="6" style="text-align:center;background-color: #e9e9e9;"| General Election, April 7, 2015

References

External links
 

1961 births
Living people
Mayors of Racine, Wisconsin
Wisconsin Democrats